Dr. B C Roy Post Graduate Institute of Paediatric Sciences is a pioneering Indian institute for research and training in paediatric sciences in Kolkata. It was established by amalgamating Dr. B. C. Roy Memorial Hospital for Children, Kolkata (Estd. 1967) and B. C. Roy Polio Clinic and Hospital for Crippled Children on 28 September 2010. It is now affiliated with West Bengal University of Health Sciences.

References

External links
 

2010 establishments in West Bengal
Affiliates of West Bengal University of Health Sciences
Medical colleges in West Bengal
Public health organisations based in India
Research institutes in Kolkata
Medical research institutes in India